Grange City is an extinct town in Columbia County, in the U.S. state of Washington. The GNIS classifies it as a populated place.

The community was named after the Grangers. With the advent of the railroads, the town's population dwindled.

References

Ghost towns in Washington (state)
Geography of Columbia County, Washington